Bedford Courthouse Square Historic District is a national historic district located at Bedford, Lawrence County, Indiana.  The district encompasses 64 contributing buildings, 1 contributing site, and 1 contributing object in the central business district of Bedford.  It developed between about 1850 and 1945, and includes examples of Italianate, Romanesque Revival, and Neoclassical style architecture.  Notable contributing resources include the Soldiers', Sailors' and Pioneers Monument (1923); Michael A. Malott House (c. 1850); Moses Fell Building (c. 1895); Stone City Bank Building (c. 1895); Dunn Memorial Masonic Temple (1918); Lawrence County Courthouse (1930); Bedford Fire Department Building (c. 1924); Citizens' Bank Building (1926); Elks Club (1916); Hamer Building (c. 1910); and Bedford Municipal Garage (1937).

It was listed in the National Register of Historic Places in 1995.

References

Historic districts on the National Register of Historic Places in Indiana
Neoclassical architecture in Indiana
Romanesque Revival architecture in Indiana
Italianate architecture in Indiana
Historic districts in Lawrence County, Indiana
National Register of Historic Places in Lawrence County, Indiana
Courthouses on the National Register of Historic Places in Indiana